The 2002 Sugar Bowl, a 2001–02 BCS game, was played on January 1, 2002. This 68th edition to the Sugar Bowl featured the Illinois Fighting Illini, and the LSU Tigers. Illinois came into the game 10–1, and ranked 8th in the BCS, whereas LSU came into the game 9–3, and ranked 13th in the BCS. Sponsored by Nokia, the game was officially known as the Nokia Sugar Bowl.

Teams
The Sugar Bowl during the BCS era usually selected the SEC champion, meaning that the winner of the SEC in 2001, LSU received an invitation to the Sugar Bowl. Their opponent would be Big Ten champion Illinois.

Illinois Fighting Illini

Illinois won the Big Ten title and earn a BCS berth as their conference's champion. The Big Ten's champion usually gets an invitation to the Rose Bowl, however the 2002 Rose Bowl was the designated BCS National Championship Game for 2001. This meant the Fighting Illini would get an at-large berth to another BCS bowl, which in turn was the Sugar Bowl. Illinois entered the bowl with a 10–1 record (7–1 in conference).

LSU Tigers

LSU defeated Tennessee in the 2001 SEC Championship Game to earn a berth in the Sugar Bowl as their conference's champion. LSU entered the bowl with a 9–3 record (5–3 in conference).

Game summary
Domanick Davis started the scoring with a 4-yard touchdown run to open up a 7–0 LSU lead. In the second quarter, he posted touchdown runs of 25 and 16 yards, as LSU opened a 21–0 lead. Quarterback Rohan Davey found wide receiver Josh Reed in the end zone for a 28–0 lead. Quarterback Kittner threw a touchdown pass to Hodges to close the deficit to 28–7. Rohan Davey added another touchdown pass before the half to open a 34–7 half-time lead.

Illinois tried to rally but were too far behind, and LSU ended up winning 47–34. Davey and Josh Reed would play in their final game together. Davey would graduate and Reed would forgo his senior season to play in the NFL at Buffalo.

Scoring summary

Statistics

References

Sugar Bowl
Sugar Bowl
Illinois Fighting Illini football bowl games
LSU Tigers football bowl games
January 2002 sports events in the United States
Sugar Bowl